Volume 7 is the fifth studio album by Brazilian psychedelic rock band Violeta de Outono, although it's their seventh studio release if the extended plays Reflexos da Noite and The Early Years are counted (hence the album's name). It was released on July 7, 2007 by Voiceprint Records, being the first album of the band to not feature founding member Angelo Pastorello, who was replaced by Gabriel Costa. It was also their first release with keyboardist Fernando Cardoso.

Track listing

Personnel
 Fabio Golfetti – vocals, guitar
 Cláudio Souza – drums
 Gabriel Costa – bass
 Fernando Cardoso – keyboards
 Walter Lima – mastering
 Flávio Tsutsumi – photography

References

External links
 Volume 7 at Violeta de Outono's official Bandcamp

2007 albums
Voiceprint Records albums
Violeta de Outono albums
Portuguese-language albums